Wells Fargo Rail (reporting marks WFRX, NATX, NDYX and FURX) is the new name for the historic First Union Rail Corporation, along with the combined business of the former GE Capital Rail Services, which Wells Fargo purchased from GE in September 2015. The new company/name took effect January 1, 2016, and is based in Rosemont, Illinois, USA.  Wells Fargo Rail is the largest railcar and locomotive leasing company in North America with over 175,000 railcars and 1,800 locomotives available.

Equipment

Railcars
Autoracks—for transporting vehicles, can be bi-level or tri-level
Box cars
Flatcars
Centerbeam flatcar
Gondolas - (Rotary Dump Coal Gondola)
Hopper cars - (Both Covered & Open Hoppers)
Intermodals
Double stacked Intermodals
Tank car

Locomotives
EMD GP38-2
EMD GP40-2
EMD MP15DC/EMD MP15AC
EMD SD40-2

Services
Wells Fargo Rail provides various services to its rail customers.  It of course leases the railcars and locomotives, but also provides the financing for the leases (Operating Leases, Net Lease, Full Service Lease and Car Hire Arrangement), and also Sale/Leaseback (buying rail stock from company and leasing it back to them), Portfolio Acquisitions, Asset Sales and Lease/Sublease.

It also offers Management Services and various Marketing Services.

References

External links

 Wells Fargo Rail webpage 

Companies based in Chicago
Rolling stock leasing companies
Wells Fargo